Burlington Township is a township in Becker County, Minnesota, United States. The population was 1,545 as of the 2010 census.

History
Burlington Township was organized in 1872. It was settled by natives of Burlington, Vermont.

Geography

The city of Frazee is entirely within this township geographically but is a separate entity.

Major highways
  U.S. Route 10
  Minnesota State Highway 87

Lakes
 Acorn Lake
 Albertson Lake (northwest three-quarters)
 Boot Lake
 Brink Lake
 Chilton Lake
 Eagle Lake
 Elbow Lake
 Fischer Lake (vast majority)
 Gebo Lake
 Graham Lake
 Pearce Lake
 Pierce Lake
 Six Lake
 Stilke Lake
 Town Lake (vast majority)
 Triglaff Lake
 Youman Lake

Adjacent townships
 Erie Township (north)
 Height of Land Township (northeast)
 Silver Leaf Township (east)
 Gorman Township, Otter Tail County (southeast)
 Hobart Township, Otter Tail County (south)
 Candor Township, Otter Tail County (southwest)
 Lake View Township (west)
 Detroit Township (northwest)

Cemeteries
The township contains these three cemeteries: Chilton, Lakeside and Sacred Heart.

Demographics
As of the census of 2000, there were 1,304 people, 463 households, and 365 families residing in the township. There were 524 housing units at an average density of 15.7/sq mi (6.1/km2). The racial makeup of the township was 97.55% White, 0.08% African American, 1.00% Native American, 0.54% Asian, 0.08% from other races, and 0.77% from two or more races. Hispanic or Latino of any race were 0.31% of the population.

There were 463 households, out of which 38.0% had children under the age of 18 living with them, 70.2% were married couples living together, 5.0% had a female householder with no husband present, and 21.0% were non-families. 18.6% of all households were made up of individuals, and 7.3% had someone living alone who was 65 years of age or older.  The average household size was 2.75 and the average family size was 3.13.

In the township the population was spread out, with 28.5% under the age of 18, 6.4% from 18 to 24, 28.8% from 25 to 44, 25.5% from 45 to 64, and 10.8% who were 65 years of age or older.  The median age was 38 years. For every 100 females, there were 106.7 males.  For every 100 females age 18 and over, there were 107.3 males.

The median income for a household in the township was $43,295, and the median income for a family was $48,158. Males had a median income of $32,596 versus $21,316 for females. The per capita income for the township was $17,003.  About 5.6% of families and 7.7% of the population were below the poverty line, including 10.1% of those under age 18 and 9.2% of those age 65 or over.

References
 United States National Atlas
 United States Census Bureau 2007 TIGER/Line Shapefiles
 United States Board on Geographic Names (GNIS)

Townships in Becker County, Minnesota
Townships in Minnesota